is a Japanese footballer who plays for Oita Trinita.

Club statistics
Updated to end of 2019 season.

1includes J1/J2 Play-Offs.

References

External links

Profile at Yokohama FC
 
 

1991 births
Living people
Japan University of Economics alumni
Association football people from Yamaguchi Prefecture
Japanese footballers
J1 League players
J2 League players
Yokohama FC players
Tokushima Vortis players
Oita Trinita players
Association football midfielders